Semangka Bay is a large bay located on the southern tip of Sumatra Island.  At the southern tip of Sumatra there are two large bays, Teluk Semangka is located in the western part. 

On the east side of the bay stretches Tanggamus Regency, with the capital city of Kotaagung located at the northern end of the bay.

References

Bays of Indonesia
Lampung